Henry Peyton may refer to:

 Sir Henry Peyton, 1st Baronet (1736–1789), MP for Cambridgeshire 1782–89
 Sir Henry Peyton, 2nd Baronet (1779–1854), MP for Cambridgeshire in 1802
 Sir Henry Peyton, 3rd Baronet (1804–1866), MP for Woodstock 1837–38

See also 
 Henry Peyton Cobb
 Peyton (disambiguation)